Søndre Strømfjord is an old Danish name for:

 Kangerlussuaq, a settlement in western Greenland
 Kangerlussuaq Fjord, a fjord in western Greenland

See also 
 Kangerlussuaq (disambiguation)
 Sondrestrom (disambiguation)